Nanxi is a town in Changge, Henan province, China. , it has 31 villages under its administration:
Xijie Village
Hujie Village
Shuizhai Village
Yangdian Village
Mawu Village
Tongzhuang Village
Gucheng Village
Guaizizhang Village
Zhangzidian Village
Dawangzhuang Village
Yinzhuang Village
Matai Village
Lizhuang Village
Gaomiao Village
Houzhang Village
Hezhuang Village
Shanguo Village
Taolou Village
Jiaomenzhuang Village
Duzhuang Village
Youhan Village
Fangyu Village
Xixinzhuang Village
Caoniantou Village
Yanzhai Village
Jiazhuang Village
Weizhuang Village
Maozhuang Village
Shuiniuchen Village
Beixinzhuang Village
Liuyanzhuang Village

See also 
 List of township-level divisions of Henan

References 

Township-level divisions of Henan
Changge